Artem Mostovyi (born 5 October 1983) is a professional Ukrainian football striker who plays for FC Desna Chernihiv in the Ukrainian First League. He moved to FC Lviv from Stal Alchevsk during the 2008 summer transfer season. However, before the deadline of the 2008–09 season, Artem Mostovyi decided to move to Desna Chernihiv where he would get more playing time.

References

External links
 
Profile on Football Squads

1983 births
Living people
Footballers from Kyiv
Ukrainian footballers
FC Borysfen Boryspil players
FC Arsenal Kyiv players
FC Arsenal-2 Kyiv players
FC Stal Alchevsk players
FC Dnipro Cherkasy players
FC Lviv players
FC Desna Chernihiv players
Association football forwards